Ann Colloton is a former competitive swimmer. She was a five-time Big Ten Conference champion, an eight-time All-American, and the NCAA breaststroke champion in 1989.  She was the first athlete in University of Michigan history to be twice named female athlete of the year and was also named Michigan's Female Athlete of the Decade for the 1980s.  She was inducted into the University of Michigan Athletic Hall of Honor in February 2008.

Competitive swimmer
A native of Iowa City, Iowa, 
Colloton attended Iowa City West High School, and was a seven-time Iowa state swimming champion who went on to star at the University of Michigan from 1987-1990.  With Colloton on the team, the Michigan women's swim team won 35 of 36 dual meets and claimed four consecutive Big Ten Conference championships from 1987-1990. Colloton was a five-time Big Ten champion and eight-time All-American.  Her 200-yard breaststroke dominance resulted in three Big Ten individual titles (1988–90) and an NCAA championship in 1989.  Her NCAA championship came in March 1989 at the Indiana University Natatorium where she swam the 200-yard breaststroke in 2:12.96 to beat Jill Johnson of Stanford by .15 seconds.

Awards and honors
Colloton was named the University of Michigan's female athlete of the year in 1989 and 1990, becoming the first athlete (male or female) in school history to receive the athlete of the year award more than once.  Only two others have matched the feat: swimmer Tom Dolan (male athlete of the year, 1995–96) and softball player Jennie Ritter (female athlete of the year, 2005–06).  In 1992, Colloton was also named Michigan's Female Athlete of the Decade for the 1980s as part of the Big Ten's celebration of women's sports.  Colloton was also a three-time Academic All-Big Ten Conference honoree and the recipient of an NCAA Postgraduate Scholarship recipient in 1990.   She was inducted into the University of Michigan Athletic Hall of Honor in February 2008 along with Heisman Trophy winner Desmond Howard.

Later years
Colloton lives in Atlanta, Georgia with her husband, Rev. Matthew Laney, and two children, Camden and Halladay. Halladay swims for the University of Vermont.

See also
University of Michigan Athletic Hall of Honor

Notes

External links
  Howard Among Six To Be Inducted Into U-M Hall of Honor
 Bruce Madej, Michigan: Champions of the West, p. 199

American female swimmers
Sportspeople from Iowa City, Iowa
Sportspeople from Kalamazoo, Michigan
Michigan Wolverines women's swimmers
Living people
Year of birth missing (living people)
Iowa City West High School alumni